George James Buckley (6 April 1935  14 September 1991) was a Labour Party politician in the United Kingdom.

Buckley was Member of Parliament for Hemsworth from 1987, replacing Alec Woodall, until his death in 1991 at the age of 56.

References
The Times Guide to the House of Commons, Times Newspapers Ltd, 1987 & 1992

1935 births
1991 deaths
Labour Party (UK) MPs for English constituencies
National Union of Mineworkers-sponsored MPs
UK MPs 1987–1992